Patella vulgata, common name the common limpet or common European limpet is a species of sea snail. It is a typical true limpet; a marine gastropod mollusc in the family Patellidae, with gills. This species occurs in the waters of Western Europe.

Radula
The radula in this species is longer than the shell itself. It contains 1,920 teeth in 160 rows of 12 teeth each. Patella vulgata is found attached to firm substrates from the high shore to the edge of the sublittoral zone, although it predominates in areas of wave action. Its shell is conical, up to around 6 cm long, and lacks defined chirality. Common limpets are believed to be able to live for up to twenty years.

Patella vulgata has been the focus of a range of scientific investigation, as far back as 1935. Its development is well described and it has been the focus of transcriptomic investigation, providing a range of genomic sequence data in this species for analysis.

Their teeth are the strongest natural material known. A study published in the Royal Society journal in 2015 concluded that "the tensile strength of limpet teeth can reach values significantly higher than spider silk, considered to be currently the strongest biological material, and only comparable to the strongest commercial carbon fibres.” The material was able to withstand 4.9 GPa. This considerable tensile strength of limpet teeth is attributed to a high mineral volume fraction of reinforcing goethite nanofibres.

Human consumption

The common limpet was formerly eaten in Ireland, especially during times of hunger such as the Great Famine of 1845–50; it was known to be very tough and had to be thoroughly boiled or roasted to be edible. One Irish proverb said that "Mussels are the food of kings, limpets are the food of peasants." Tomas O'Crohan described eating them in his memoir The Islandman.
They are also consumed in Asturias in Spain under the name "Llampares"

See also
Limpet

Gallery

References

  Linnaeus, C. (1758). Systema Naturae per regna tria naturae, secundum classes, ordines, genera, species, cum characteribus, differentiis, synonymis, locis. Editio decima, reformata. Laurentius Salvius: Holmiae. ii, 824 pp.
 Lespinet, Nederbragt, Cassan, Dictus, Van Loon, et al. Characterisation of two snail genes in the gastropod mollusc Patella vulgata. Implications for understanding the ancestral function of the snail-related genes in Bilateria. 2002.

External links

 Entry in Encyclopedia of Life
 MarLIN species information
 Live underwater image
 BBC Info retrieved 2012
 FSC Info- great pix Retrieved 2012
 

Patellidae
Molluscs of the Atlantic Ocean
Marine molluscs of Europe
Gastropods described in 1758
Taxa named by Carl Linnaeus